Parmellops perspicuus, also known as the transparent semislug, is a species of semislug that is endemic to Australia's Lord Howe Island in the Tasman Sea.

Description
The shell of the mature animal is reduced, plate-like and only faintly visible, 0.5 mm in height, with a diameter of 11.7 mm, reddish in colour. The animal is white with a grey tail, the shell clearly visible through the lappets.

Distribution
The semislug is only found on the summit of Mount Gower, crawling on palm leaves and trunks at night and after rain.

References

perspicuus
Gastropods of Lord Howe Island
Taxa named by Winston Ponder
Gastropods described in 2016